Zanoni was a ship built in Liverpool, England in 1865 by W. H. Potter & Co as a 338-ton composite barque. It was owned by Thomas Royden & Sons who intended to use it for the East India trade.

It sank in Gulf St Vincent in South Australia in 1867. The wreck is now the best-preserved merchant ship wreck remaining in South Australia from the 19th century.

Voyages
Zanoni left Liverpool on 14 February 1866 for Lima, Peru. There she unloaded the cargo from England and loaded 400 tons of guano bound for Port Louis, Mauritius. At Port Louis, she loaded 4551 bags of sugar for Port Adelaide, South Australia. and arrived on 13 January 1867. She unloaded the sugar, then loaded 15 tons of bark and some wheat, and proceeded up the coast on 2 February to Port Wakefield to load more wheat, intending to return to Port Adelaide then return to England.

The ship encountered a violent squall on the way from Port Wakefield back to Port Adelaide carrying the bark and a total of 4025 bags of wheat and sank without trace. The 16 people on board (captain, 13 crew and two stevedores) were all rescued, but the hull was not located until 1983.

The wreck
Despite several searches and a £100 reward in the weeks following the sinking, Zanoni was not found in 1867.

The site of the wreck of Zanoni is now protected by a  exclusion zone declared under the South Australian Historic Shipwrecks Act 1981 on 26 May 1983. No boating of any kind is permitted inside this zone, in an attempt to protect what remains of the ship from damage from fishing nets and boat anchors.

See also
List of shipwrecks of Australia
List of shipwrecks in 1867
Ship graveyard#Australia

References

Shipwrecks of South Australia
Gulf St Vincent
1865 ships
Ships sunk with no fatalities
Australian Shipwrecks with protected zone
Ships built in Lancashire